Palaeosabatinca is an extinct genus of small primitive metallic moths within the family Micropterigidae, containing one species,  Palaeosabatinca zherichini . It is known from Russia. The fossil remains are dated to the Lower Cretaceous.

References

†
Fossil Lepidoptera
Cretaceous insects
Fossils of Russia
Prehistoric insect genera
†